The Western Interstate Commission for Higher Education (WICHE, pronounced 'wit-chee') is a regional interstate agency and 501(c)(3) nonprofit organization based in Boulder, Colo., serving 16 member states and territories. WICHE's diverse programs and collaborations aim to foster innovation, resource-sharing, research and informed policy, affordability, and access for states, students, and higher education institutions throughout and beyond the Western U.S. It is one of four such regional higher education commissions in the U.S.

Commission history, governance, and membership
The agency was created in 1953 in the wake of the ratification by U.S. Congress of the Western Regional Interstate Compact. Its charge has been to help Western states and institutions address higher education and workforce issues distinct to their region, issues that warrant a regional (rather than one-state or one-institution) approach. WICHE is governed by a commission of 48 individuals, three from each of 16 member states and territories, and appointed by the governors of those states. The commission directs WICHE's activities, which have varied over the years as higher education needs and priorities have evolved. Many historical details are available in an online WICHE newsletters archive, and in a book chronicling the first 40 years of its history.

Current WICHE members include: Alaska, Arizona, California, Colorado, Hawaii, Idaho, Montana, Nevada, New Mexico, North Dakota, Oregon, South Dakota, Utah, Washington and Wyoming, and U.S. Pacific Territories and Freely Associated States (which currently include Guam and the Commonwealth of the Northern Mariana Islands). Commission activities are funded in part through member-state dues, and in part through grants from foundations and other funders.

Student Access Programs

Western Undergraduate Exchange
WICHE fosters student affordability and access through three interstate exchange programs, the largest of which is the Western Undergraduate Exchange (WUE, pronounced 'woo-E'). Founded in 1988, WUE enables discounted undergraduate tuition for more than 40,000 students in the U.S. West. Through WUE, 160 participating Western public colleges and universities allow non-resident students to enroll at a tuition rate of no more than 150% of the resident rate—leading to an average nonresident-tuition discount of $9,000, with many students saving more than 50% of the standard nonresident tuition rate. In 2017-18, aggregate annual student savings through WUE exceeded $370 million.

Western Regional Graduate Program
WICHE's Western Regional Graduate Program (WRGP) is similar in function to WUE, but for graduate students. WRGP students pay in-state tuition rates for selected graduate programs at participating universities. In 2017-18, more than 1,500 students saved more than $24 million through the WRGP program.

Professional Student Exchange Program
WICHE's Professional Student Exchange Program (PSEP) is similar in function to WUE and WRGP, specifically serving students in select professional healthcare programs. This program is now offered in Alaska, Arizona, Colorado, Hawaii, Montana, Nevada, New Mexico, North Dakota, Utah, and Wyoming. PSEP students receive reduced tuition to attend specified healthcare programs and in select cases gain preference in admission. In 2017-18, participating PSEP states allocated $14.3 million to offset tuition costs for their state's PSEP students (over 600 in 2017-18). In receiving PSEP funding, students are expected (and in some cases required) to return to practice in their home states.

Other WICHE programs
Several other WICHE programs and initiatives have regional or national profiles, including but not limited to:

 The WICHE Cooperative for Educational Technologies (WCET), founded in 1989 (under a different name), serves as a hub for innovation and dialogue about emerging trends in educational technology and online learning. WCET's 350-plus member institutions represent 49 states and seven countries. Key initiatives under its auspices include the State Authorization Network, the Z Initiative, and the Digital Learning Solutions Network.
 Knocking at the College Door is a quadrennial report and series of projections of high school graduate populations, and is considered among higher education professionals and policymakers to be a foremost resource on this subject. The report's 9th edition was published in December 2016, with the next edition slated for 2020. Knocking is among numerous research and policy outputs supporting informed decision-making, including perennial reviews of Western institution tuition and fees and other data benchmarks, and a WICHE Insights publication series.
WICHE's Mental Health Program provides behavioral health technical assistance, education, consulting and research services for stakeholders in WICHE member states—in pursuit of the program's goal of improving the capacity of the behavioral health workforce and the effectiveness of the public behavioral health system.
The Multistate Longitudinal Data Exchange is a developing system to exchange longitudinal information captured by the K-12 education, postsecondary education, and workforce sectors in several states, which will enable researchers to answer important questions about the mobility of human capital by linking education and employment across state lines.
The Interstate Passport initiative aims to enable seamless transfer of lower-division credits (and other attainment measures) between participating institutions across state lines, saving students time and money. The Interstate Passport Network currently has 25 member institutions.

See also

Midwestern Higher Education Compact
New England Board of Higher Education
Southern Regional Education Board

References

External links
 Official Web site of WICHE

Higher education in the United States
Distance education institutions based in the United States
1953 establishments in the United States
Organizations established in 1953
Higher education authorities